2008 Konstitutsiya, provisionally designated , is a carbonaceous asteroid from the outer region of the asteroid belt, approximately 50 kilometers in diameter. It was discovered on 27 September 1973, by Soviet astronomer Lyudmila Chernykh at the Crimean Astrophysical Observatory in Nauchnyj, on the Crimean peninsula. The asteroid was named for the 1977 Soviet Constitution.

Classification and orbit 

Konstitutsiya orbits the Sun in the outer main-belt at a distance of 2.9–3.5 AU once every 5 years and 9 months (2,105 days). Its orbit has an eccentricity of 0.10 and an inclination of 21° with respect to the ecliptic.

Physical characteristics 

Konstitutsiya  is an assumed C-type asteroid.

Lightcurves 

Two rotational lightcurves of Konstitutsiya were obtained from photometric observations in 2011. Lightcurve analysis gave a rotation period of 11.2692 and 11.279 hours with a low brightness variation of 0.08 and 0.06 magnitude, respectively. A low brightness amplitude suggests that the body has a nearly spheroidal shape.

Diameter and albedo 

According to the surveys carried out by the Japanese Akari satellite and the NEOWISE mission of NASA's Wide-field Infrared Survey Explorer, Konstitutsiya measures between 45.46 and 53.942 kilometers in diameter and its surface has an albedo between 0.0505 and 0.070. The Collaborative Asteroid Lightcurve Link derives an albedo of 0.0580 and a diameter of 50.31 kilometers based on an absolute magnitude of 10.2.

Naming 

This minor planet was named on the occasion of the adoption of the new 1977 Soviet Constitution, also known as Brezhnev Constitution. It was the third and last Soviet Constitution ever to be adopted. The official  was published by the Minor Planet Center on 1 September 1978.

References

External links 
 Asteroid Lightcurve Database (LCDB), query form (info )
 Dictionary of Minor Planet Names, Google books
 Asteroids and comets rotation curves, CdR – Observatoire de Genève, Raoul Behrend
 Discovery Circumstances: Numbered Minor Planets (1)-(5000) – Minor Planet Center
 
 

002008
Discoveries by Lyudmila Chernykh
Named minor planets
19730927